The Australian People's Choice Awards was an Australian version of the American awards show, People's Choice Awards, staged in 1998 and 1999. The awards recognised works of popular culture and people active in it. Winners were chosen by popular vote.

Winners and nominees

1998
Source:

1999
Source:

See also
 List of television awards
Other Australian awards termed People's Choice Awards:
 Australian Country Music People's Choice Awards
 Australian Traveller magazine People's Choice Awards
 Dimmi People's Choice Awards (a crowdsourced ranking of restaurants)
 National Landcare People's Choice Award

References

Award ceremonies in Australia
Australian film awards
Australian television awards
Australian sports trophies and awards
Australia